Canadian singles charts were compiled by RPM from 1964 to 2000 and The Record from 1983 to 1996. Nielsen SoundScan compiled charts from 1996 to the present; Billboard's Canadian Hot 100, compiled from Nielsen SoundScan and Nielsen Broadcast Data Systems, has been published on a weekly basis since 2007.

CHUM Chart (1957–1964)

RPM (1964–2000)

Alternative rock charts

Country music charts

Dance charts

Top singles charts

Billboard (2000–present)

Canada Country Airplay

Canadian Singles Chart

Canadian Hot 100

See also

The Top 100 Canadian Albums
List of best-selling singles in Canada